The Captives may refer to:

 Captivi, a Latin play by the early Roman playwright Titus Maccius Plautus
 The Captives (1724 play), a 1724 work by the British writer John Gay
 The Captives (Delap play), 1786 work by the British writer John Delap
 The Captives (film), a 2004 American film

See also
 Captives, a 1994 British romantic crime drama